Nathan Grey may refer to:

Nathan Grey (rugby union), Australian rugby union footballer
Nate Grey, the X-Man, Nathaniel Grey